Bondying is a comic book character created by Filipino graphic novelist Mars Ravelo and first introduced by Pilipino Komiks on August 29, 1953. He is a large person who is still considered a baby.

Character history

Comic books

Films
In 1954, Fred Montilla played Bondying in the first film adaptation of the same title. After the film became a hit, a sequel titled Tatay Na si Bondying was released in 1955.
In 1973, actor Jay Ilagan played the role in Ato ti Bondying.
In 1989, Viva Films released Mars Ravelo's Bondying: The Little Big Boy.  The title role of Bondying was performed by veteran comedian Jimmy Santos, although the film later ends with the title character officially maturing for his age. Mars Ravelo's Bondying: The Little Big Boy was a box office hit in the Philippines.

Television
Bondying is portrayed by actor Jimmy Santos in the 1989 television production, Bondying: The Little Big Boy'ger'.

Collected editions

See also
Barok

References

External links

1953 comics debuts
Child characters in comics
Comics characters introduced in 1953
Fictional Filipino people
Filipino comics characters
Humor comics
Male characters in comics
Philippine comics adapted into films